Phil Daley (born 12 April 1967) is a former footballer who played as a forward in the Football League.

He started his League career at Wigan Athletic. He made 161 league appearances for the club and scored 39 goals.

In August 1994 he moved to  Lincoln City.

References

External links
 

1967 births
Living people
English footballers
Association football forwards
Wigan Athletic F.C. players
Lincoln City F.C. players
Bangor City F.C. players
English Football League players